Susan O'Connor (born May 3, 1977) is a Canadian curler from Calgary, Alberta. She is an Olympic silver medallist.

Career
In 2000, O'Connor played third for Kevin Koe at the Canadian Mixed Curling Championship. The team, which also included Greg Northcott and Lawnie MacDonald, won the championship.

In 2007, O'Connor won her first provincial championship playing third for Cheryl Bernard, and represented Team Alberta at the 2007 Scotties Tournament of Hearts. They again represented Alberta at the Scotties in 2009.

At the 2008 Canadian Mixed Championship, O'Connor played third for Dean Ross, and won her second Mixed title with team mates Tim Krassman and Susan Wright. O'Connor and Ross represented Canada at the 2008 World Mixed Doubles Curling Championship as a result, and finished in fifth place.

With Team Bernard, O'Connor played in the Roar of the Rings Olympic Trials for the much coveted Olympic spot, winning the tournament. O'Connor represented Team Canada at the 2010 Winter Olympics in
Vancouver, British Columbia, Canada, winning the Silver medal in the exciting final match versus Sweden.

On February 8, 2011, it was announced that the Bernard team would disband at the end of the 2010–2011 season. O'Connor, however, remained with Bernard, who added Lori Olson-Johns and Jennifer Sadleir to the team.

In 2012 Shannon Aleksic replaced Sadleir at lead. At the 2014 Scotties Tournament of Hearts O'Connor and Team Bernard won the silver medal, losing to Valerie Sweeting's team in the final.

At the 2016 World Women's Championship O'Connor played as alternate for Chelsea Carrey's team. The team finished 4th, losing to Russia in the bronze medal match.

Personal life
O'Connor is employed as a respiratory therapist at Foothills Hospital in Calgary, Alberta. She is married to fellow curler Todd Brick and has one child.

Teams

Grand Slam record

Former events

References

External links

1977 births
Canadian people of Irish descent
Living people
Curlers from Calgary
Canadian women curlers
Canadian mixed curling champions
Curlers at the 2010 Winter Olympics
Olympic silver medalists for Canada
Olympic curlers of Canada
Olympic medalists in curling
Medalists at the 2010 Winter Olympics
Canada Cup (curling) participants